Circle: International Survey of Constructivist Art was an almost 300-page art book published in London, England, in 1937. It was edited by the artists Ben Nicholson and Naum Gabo and the architect Leslie Martin with the layout being designed by Barbara Hepworth. Circle was intended to be a series of publications so is sometimes referred to as a journal or magazine, although only one issue was actually produced.

Contributors are listed and categorized as painters, sculptors, architects, and writers on the front cover. The main texts are Gabo's essay "The Constructive Idea in Art" that is the main statement by the artist on his work and Piet Mondrian's seminal essay "Plastic Art and Pure Plastic Art". As well as these, others featured are:

J. D. Bernal
Constantin Brâncuși
Le Corbusier
Karel Honzík
El Lissitzky
Malevich
László Moholy-Nagy
Henry Moore
Lewis Mumford
Richard Neutra
Antoine Pevsner
Herbert Read
Cecil Stephenson

Circle was reprinted in 1971 in the United States by Praeger Publishers and in the UK by Faber & Faber, in paperback.

References

1937 books
1937 in England
Books about visual art
Books about creativity
Architecture books
English non-fiction books
Visual arts magazines
English art
Constructivism (art)